William Hall Yale (November 12, 1831 – January 25, 1917) was a Minnesota lawyer and Republican politician who served as a Senator and sixth Lieutenant Governor of Minnesota.

Biography

Early life
Yale was born on November 12, 1831 in New Haven, Connecticut, to Wooster Yale and Lucy Yale (née Hall). His father was a descendant of Thomas Yale, uncle of Elihu Yale and the early settlers of the New Haven Colony. After attending school in Wallingford, Connecticut, and at Suffield Academy he worked as a teacher in Norwalk, Connecticut, for 5 years. In 1854 he changed careers and worked as a bookkeeper for the Sharps Rifle Manufacturing Company. In 1857, he decided to move west to Minnesota.

Career
Yale settled in Winona, Minnesota. Shortly after arriving Yale was admitted to the bar (he had been studying law in his spare time for several years) and began a law firm with William B. Mitchell. He was quickly elected to local office in Winona as city justice, probate judge, and prosecutor. In 1867 he was elected to the Minnesota State Senate. In 1869 he was elected Lieutenant Governor under Governor Horace Austin, serving from January 7, 1870 to January 9, 1874. Yale became the 5th President of the Minnesota Senate from 1870 to 1874, and was elected to the Minnesota State Senate again in 1875.

An active member of the Republican party, Yale was a delegate to 2 different national conventions: the 1876 Republican National Convention (which he was unable to attend due to illness) and the 1892 Republican National Convention in Minneapolis. He also led the Minnesota Republican conventions in 1872, 1873 and 1880.

In 1894 Governor Knute Nelson named Yale as a regent of the University of Minnesota. After he was once again elected to the Minnesota State Senate in 1895 the Minnesota Supreme Court ruled he could not serve as a regent until his term expired. In 1899 he was elected to his final term as a member of the Minnesota House of Representatives.

In his legal career Yale worked with many other legal and political figures in the state including Daniel Sheldon Norton, William Windom and Thomas Wilson.

Personal life
In 1851 he married Sarah E. Banks of Norwalk, Connecticut. They had one son (Charles B. Yale). Sarah died in 1871. In 1872 he remarried to Mary Louisa Hoyt. They had one son (William Hoyt Yale).

Death
Yale died in 1917 and is buried in Oakland Cemetery in St. Paul, Minnesota.

References

1831 births
1917 deaths
Lieutenant Governors of Minnesota
Politicians from New Haven, Connecticut
Republican Party Minnesota state senators
Republican Party members of the Minnesota House of Representatives
Minnesota lawyers
19th-century American politicians
19th-century American lawyers